Northwest Technical College is a public technical college in Bemidji, Minnesota. It is part of the Minnesota State Colleges and Universities System. It was founded in 1965 as Bemidji Area Vocational Technical Institute.

References

External links
 

Community colleges in Minnesota
Education in Beltrami County, Minnesota
Educational institutions established in 1965
Two-year colleges in the United States
1965 establishments in Minnesota